Lattingtown is a village located within the Town of Oyster Bay in Nassau County, on Long Island, in New York, United States. The population was 1,739 at the 2010 census.

History 
The area of marsh along the coast was occupied by a band of Lenape, known as the Matinecock, a name associated with the place.

The Matinecock sold the area in 1660 to Richard Latting and his son, Josiah Latting. The Lattings sold marsh reeds for use in thatched-roof houses. The same family later established the hamlet of Lattingtown at Marlborough, Ulster County, New York, north of Manhattan.

The 1986 film The Money Pit was partially filmed in Lattingtown.

Geography

Demographics

As of the census of 2000, there were 1,860 people, 627 households, and 509 families residing in the village. The population density was 491.9 people per square mile (190.0/km2). There were 688 housing units at an average density of 182.0 per square mile (70.3/km2). The racial makeup of the village was 94.46% White, 0.59% African American, 3.49% Asian, 0.38% from other races, and 1.08% from two or more races. Hispanic or Latino of any race were 2.31% of the population.

There were 627 households, out of which 37.2% had children under the age of 18 living with them, 73.0% were married couples living together, 5.3% had a female householder with no husband present, and 18.8% were non-families. 16.1% of all households were made up of individuals, and 8.5% had someone living alone who was 65 years of age or older. The average household size was 2.93 and the average family size was 3.25.

In the village, the population was spread out, with 26.2% under the age of 18, 4.6% from 18 to 24, 24.0% from 25 to 44, 31.0% from 45 to 64, and 14.2% who were 65 years of age or older. The median age was 42 years. For every 100 females, there were 93.3 males. For every 100 females age 18 and over, there were 91.5 males.

The median income for a household in the village was $136,807, and the median income for a family was $156,462. Males had a median income of $100,000 versus $44,063 for females. The per capita income for the village was $76,260. About 2.1% of families and 4.5% of the population were below the poverty line, including 1.5% of those under age 18 and 6.6% of those age 65 or over.

Government 
As of August 2021, the Mayor of Lattingtown is Robert W. Fagiola, the Deputy Mayor is Carol M. Harrington, and the Village Trustees are Mark DeNatale, Stephen Ely, Carol M. Harrington, and Andrea Volpe.

Landmarks 
 Bailey Arboretum (named after longtime residents Frank and Marie Louise Bailey)
 Underhill Burying Ground, a family cemetery of the Underhills

References

External links 

 Official website

Oyster Bay (town), New York
Villages in New York (state)
Long Island Sound
Villages in Nassau County, New York
Populated coastal places in New York (state)